The Prince-Bishopric of Hildesheim was an ecclesiastical principality of the Holy Roman Empire from the Middle Ages until its dissolution in 1803. The Prince-Bishopric must not be confused with the Diocese of Hildesheim, which was larger and over which the prince-bishop exercised only the spiritual authority of an ordinary bishop.

History 

 
His son King Louis the Pious established the bishopric at Hildesheim in 815, dedicated to Virgin Mary.

According to legend delivered by the Brothers Grimm, the king was hunting in the wintery woods of Elze, when he realized that he had lost his pendant with the relic of Blessed Virgin Mary. Distraught he sent out his attendance who finally discovered a flowering rose bush with the relic in his branches, which it would not let go. Louis had a chapel built by the side of the rose, the later St. Mary's Cathedral. A rosa canina is still growing at the apse of the cathedral, called the Thousand-year Rose (Tausendjähriger Rosenstock).

His son King Louis the German appointed the famous former archbishop of Rheims, Ebbo, as bishop between 845 and 847. Ebbo's successor Altfrid began the construction of the cathedral, the groundplan of which has not been changed since then. During the reign of the Saxon Ottonian dynasty Hildesheim, together with the neighbouring bishoprics of Halberstadt and Magdeburg, became the central ecclesiastical territory of the Holy Roman Empire. Bishop Bernward (993-1022) and his successor Gotthard (1022-1038) added much to the architectonic and cultural tradition of the present-day World Heritage Site.

At the Reichstag at Mainz of August 15, 1235 Bishop Conrad II reached the official acknowledgement of Hildesheim as a Prince-bishopric (Hochstift) by Emperor Frederick II. As a negative consequence of this success, Hildesheim began to interfere with the neighbouring Welf duchy of Brunswick-Lüneburg, culminating in the Hildesheim Diocesan Feud 1519-1523 with the warlike Brunswick duke Henry the Younger that led to a significant loss of territories.

In the 16th century, most of the diocese as well as most of the state of Hildesheim switched to Protestantism. But the Bishopric managed not only to retain its independence from the surrounding Protestant states of Brunswick-Lüneburg, but also to retrieve large parts of the lost estates, mostly because its bishops were members of the powerful House of Wittelsbach from 1573 until 1761, the last Clemens August of Bavaria from 1723, who also was archbishop and prince-elector of Cologne, prince-bishop of Münster, Osnabrück and Paderborn as well as Grand Master of the Teutonic Order.

In the course of the German Mediatisation of 1803, Hildesheim was secularised and its territory was annexed to Prussia. Four years later, however, Prussia lost it to the newly established Kingdom of Westphalia. The Congress of Vienna of 1815 gave the territory of the former prince-bishopric to the Kingdom of Hanover.

Subdivisions (Ämter)

Wittelsbach prince-bishops
 Ernest (1573-1612)
 Ferdinand (1612-1650) (Administrator)
 Maximilian Henry (1650-1688)
 Joseph Clemens (1702-1723)
 Clemens August (1723-1761)

See also
 List of Bishops of Hildesheim

References

External links
 Map of Lower Saxony in 1789

1803 disestablishments
Hildesheim
History of Hildesheim
Roman Catholic Diocese of Hildesheim
Hildesheim
Former monarchies of Europe